Gulbrand Oscar Johan Lunde (14 September 1901, Bergen – 26 October 1942, Våge, Rauma, Norway) was a Norwegian councillor of state in the NS government of Vidkun Quisling in 1940, acting councillor of state 1940-1941 and minister 1941–1942. Lunde and wife, Marie, died when his car fell off the ferry dock at Våge, between Ålesund and Åndalsnes. The incident was investigated since sabotage was suspected, but the conclusion was that it was merely an accident. However, the 2012 biography by Arntsen and Harestad concludes that this accident was staged by the German occupiers who wanted to remove a bothersome minister. Professor Gunnar Skirbekk quotes German intelligence reports indicating that Lunde was unpopular with the occupiers because of his focus on the more narrow "norse" tradition as opposed to the wider "germanic" concept.

References

External links
 

1901 births
1942 deaths
Politicians from Bergen
Members of Nasjonal Samling
Norwegian anti-communists

Deaths by drowning in Norway